Yew Chung International School of Shanghai (YCIS Shanghai; Simplified Chinese上海耀中国际学校, Traditional Chinese 上海耀中國際學校, pinyin Shànghǎi Yàozhōng Guójì Xuéxiào) is a fully triple accredited, co-educational international school in Shanghai, with campuses in both the Puxi and Pudong districts of the city. In 1993, YCIS Shanghai became the first international school officially recognised by, and registered, with the Chinese government in Shanghai.

Origins and History
Yew Chung International School of Shanghai is accredited by the Ministry of Education of the People's Republic of China to enrol the children of foreign passport holders. The school provides an international education in a bilingual environment (English and Mandarin) to children ages 2 to 18-years-old (K2 to Year 13). The international school is part of a network of schools under the Yew Chung Foundation, which includes campuses in Hong Kong, Beijing, Qingdao, Chongqing, and Silicon Valley, United States.

Quick facts
 YCIS Shanghai was the first international school officially recognised by, and registered with, the Chinese government in 1993. 
 YCIS Shanghai offers a curriculum based on the National Curriculum for England (NCE) and provides education in a bilingual environment (English and Mandarin).
 YCIS Shanghai has five campuses (three in Puxi and two in Pudong).
 Students learn to read, write, and speak Mandarin Chinese through curricula tailored for both non-native and native speakers.  
 After Years 10–11, Secondary school students are able to sit the IGCSE examinations. Students in Years 12-13 study courses within the framework of the IB Diploma Programme leading to the IB Diploma examinations.
 YCIS Shanghai is an accredited school, recognised by the New England Association of Schools and Colleges (NEASC), the Council of International Schools (CIS), and the National Center for School Curriculum and Textbook Development (NCCT). 
 Students in Years 1-3 participate in the school's violin programme, with weekly violin lessons and various performance opportunities. 
 Two qualified Teachers, one International and one Chinese, teach together as ‘Co-Teachers’ in the Kindergarten and Primary classrooms.

Timeline
 1932: First Yew Chung school established in Hong Kong.
 1992: The Mayor of Shanghai, Mr. Huang Ju (黄菊), invites YCIS to open an international school in Shanghai to serve the growing number of expatriate families moving to the city. 
 1993: YCIS Shanghai (Hongqiao Campus) opens as the first international school in Shanghai to be officially recognised by and registered with, the Chinese government.
 1995: The YCIS Shanghai Gubei Campus opens.
 1999: A third campus is opened in Pudong, now known as the Regency Park Campus.
 2007: The Century Park Campus opens in Pudong.
2018: The Ronghua Campus opens in Gubei and is the first K12 school in China to receive the Leadership in Energy and Environmental Design Gold Certification from the United States Green Business Council.

Curriculum
Yew Chung International School of Shanghai follows the National Curriculum for England (NCE) combined with a proprietary Chinese language and culture programme (Mandarin).

Chinese Programme

Students learn to read, write, and speak Mandarin Chinese through research-based curricula tailored for both non-native and native speakers. The Chinese Language and Culture Programme runs from Kindergarten through Secondary, with multiple levels for each age range.

Co-Teaching Model

Within each Kindergarten and Primary School classroom; two qualified Teachers, one Western and one Chinese, share the responsibilities relating to the care and education of the students in their class. They provide learning experiences in a bi-cultural and bilingual learning environment.

IGCSE

The curriculum for students in Years 10-11 culminate in the International General Certificate for Secondary Education (IGCSE) examinations. Designed to prepare students for the IB Diploma Programme in Years 12–13, these two years of study integrate core subjects with a variety of electives, community service work, and extracurricular activities.

IB Diploma Programme

YCIS Shanghai offers the IB Diploma Programme, which provides an internationally accepted qualification for entry into higher education and is recognised by many universities worldwide.

Character Education
YCIS Shanghai's Character Education programme provides students with practical knowledge and skills to help them face the ethical, moral, spiritual, social, and cultural issues of adulthood by reflecting on their experiences in real world situations.

Accreditations and Authorisations
 New England Association of Schools and Colleges (NEASC)
 Council of International Schools (CIS)
 National Center for School Curriculum and Textbook Development (NCCT)
 Cambridge International Certificate of Secondary Education (IGCSE)
 International Baccalaureate Diploma Programme (IBDP)
 The Duke of Edinburgh's International Award

Awards
In June 2012, Yew Chung International Schools received the “Cambridge Award for Excellence in Education”, as the first and only international school in China to receive this award.

Network of Schools
 Yew Chung International School of Hong Kong
 Yew Chung International School of Beijing
 Yew Chung International School of Chongqing
 Yew Chung International School of Qingdao
 Yew Chung International School of Silicon Valley

References

External links

Yew Chung International School of Shanghai
YCIS Shanghai school profiles on Time Out Shanghai Family

Educational institutions established in 1932
1932 establishments in China
Educational institutions established in 1993
1993 establishments in China
International schools in Shanghai
Cambridge schools in China
International Baccalaureate schools in China
Private schools in Shanghai